The DeForest Area School District is a school district based in the city of DeForest, Wisconsin.

The school district covers approximately 100 square miles, and serves the communities of DeForest and Windsor. It has an enrollment of 3,848, and has a 97% graduation rate. The district administers four elementary schools, one middle school, and one high school.

Schools

Secondary 

 DeForest Area High School (DAHS)
 DeForest Area Middle School
 Harvest Intermediate School

Elementary 

 Eagle Point Elementary School
 Windsor Elementary School
 Yahara Elementary School
 Community-based 4 Year Old Kindergarten

References 

School districts in Wisconsin
Education in Dane County, Wisconsin